Schleimer is a German language occupational surname for a maker of glue or bird lime and may refer to:
Catherine Schleimer-Kill (1884–1973), Luxembourg suffragist and women's rights activist
Irving Schleimer (1921–2005), Law school dean
Joe Schleimer (1909–1988), Canadian freestyle sport wrestler 
Lukas Schleimer (1999), German professional footballer

References 

German-language surnames
Occupational surnames